The Bishop of Birmingham heads the Church of England Diocese of Birmingham, in the Province of Canterbury, in England.

The diocese covers the North West of the historical county of Warwickshire and has its see in the City of Birmingham, West Midlands, where the seat of the diocese is located at the Cathedral Church of Saint Philip which was elevated to cathedral status in 1905.

The bishop's residence is Bishop's Croft in Harborne, Birmingham.

The office has existed since the foundation of the see in 1905 from the Diocese of Worcester under King Edward VII.

The See is vacant following the retirement of David Urquhart on 18 October 2022; in the vacancy, Anne Hollinghurst, Bishop of Aston, is also acting diocesan bishop.

The bishop is assisted, throughout the whole diocese, by the suffragan Bishop of Aston.

List of bishops

Assistant bishops
Among those who have served as assistant bishops of the diocese were:
19131937 (ret.): Hamilton Baynes, Vicar/Provost of Birmingham (from 1931), former Bishop of Natal and Assistant Bishop of Southwell
1937–1958 (d.): James Linton, Rector of Handsworth and former Bishop in Persia
1951–1953 (res.): James Hughes, Vicar of Edgbaston and former Bishop of Barbados; became Bishop of Matabeleland and Archbishop of Central Africa, then Bishop of Trinidad
1962–1972: George Sinker, Provost of Birmingham and former Bishop in Nagpur
19881995 (ret.): Michael Whinney, Canon of Birmingham (from 1992), former Bishop suffragan of Aston and Bishop of Southwell
19972003 (ret.): David Evans, Gen. Sec. of SAMS and former Bishop in Peru

See also
Archbishop of Birmingham
Bishop of Aston

References

External links
Diocese of Birmingham
Birmingham Cathedral

 
Birmingham
Bishops of Birmingham
Anglican Diocese of Birmingham